Mohammad Shamshad Ali was a Bangladeshi physician who was killed in the Bangladesh Liberation war.

Early life
Ali was born in his maternal home in Allahabad, Bihar on 9 March 1934. His father, Abul Hossain, was a doctor and a captain in the British Indian Army. His ancestral paternal home was in Sonatala, Bogra District. Ali studied in Rajshahi Medical College and then at Sir Salimullah Medical College, finishing his MBBS in 1963.

Career
In 1963, Ali joined the Pakistan government medical service. He was posted in Thana Health Complex in Comilla, where he worked for two years. After which he resigned and opened a private practice in Parbatipur, with his own pharmacy. The area was majority Bihari and was the site of frequent conflict between them and Bengalis. He supported the 1969 uprising in East Pakistan.

Death
On 8 April 1971, Pakistan Army accompanied by Biharis raided his house and abducted him. He was taken to the suburbs of the town and shot dead. His body was chopped up and burnt in a rail engine at the local rail station. A road in Parbatipur has been renamed as Shaheed Dr Shamshad Ali Road. on 14 December 2000, Bangladesh Post Office issued commemorative posts in his name on the occasion of Martyred Intellectuals Day.

References

1934 births
1971 deaths
People killed in the Bangladesh Liberation War
Bangladeshi general practitioners
People from Bihar
People from Parbatipur Upazila
People from Bogra District